Coleophora alabama is a moth of the family Coleophoridae. It is found in coastal Alabama in the United States.

References

alabama
Moths described in 1994
Moths of North America